Bolívar Municipality is one of the 14 municipalities of the state of Yaracuy, Venezuela. The municipality is located in northwestern Yaracuy, occupying an area of 1087 km ² with a population of 25,926 inhabitants in 2001. The capital lies at Aroa, which was founded to serve the Aroa mines, now defunct.

Name
The municipality is one of several in Venezuela named "Bolívar Municipality" in honour of Venezuelan independence hero Simón Bolívar.

References

External links
Official site

Municipalities of Yaracuy